East Kowloon Corridor (aka East Kowloon Way) is a motorway in Kowloon, Hong Kong. Part of Route 5, it is a dual two-lane carriageway viaduct running from the western exit of Kai Tak Tunnel near  to its ramp on Chatham Road North in Hung Hom, near where Ma Tau Wai Road joins the latter.

Description
Since its completion in 1981, East Kowloon Corridor, together with Airport Tunnel (renamed Kai Tak Tunnel after the airport in 2006 was closed in 1998), play a crucial role in diverting road traffic in Kowloon by feeding traffic between Hung Hom and Kwun Tong by providing a shortcut, thereby avoiding causing traffic congestion in To Kwa Wan, Mong Kok, Kowloon City and Ngau Chi Wan where traffic is already saturated. In particular, East Kowloon Corridor gives drivers an alternative overpass between Hung Hom and Kowloon City. In this sense, East Kowloon Corridor serves as an alternative for drivers since it has  and no traffic lights.

Geographically, East Kowloon Corridor runs on top of Kowloon City Road and Ma Tau Wai Road. Just ahead of the entrance to Kai Tak Tunnel lies the only branching exit of East Kowloon Corridor, which goes to Kowloon City Road northbound from the northbound direction, San Shan Road eastbound from the southbound direction, and the only branching entrance to the southbound direction fed from San Shan Road westbound. It descends and joins into Chatham Road North near an intersection with Fat Kwong Street.

Although the road is named East Kowloon Corridor, its location for some purpose is often considered to be in West Kowloon. The word "East" is used in order to disambiguate from West Kowloon Corridor, which is situated farther west near Lai Chi Kok. Furthermore in the earlier decades, To Kwa Wan and Hung Hom both lied in the eastern half of Kowloon Peninsula with the British Section of the KCR serving as the boundary, and the area now known as East Kowloon was part of New Kowloon. However, the entire peninsula is now integrated into West Kowloon.

Effect on surroundings
As many buildings were already built around Kowloon City Road and Ma Tau Wai Road before East Kowloon Corridor was constructed, residents in the district, especially those living in lower floors of buildings on the sides of the flyover, were strongly affected by the noise generated from car engines during rush hour. Many residents have already moved out from those buildings and the buildings were turned into commercial or other uses.

References

Route 5 (Hong Kong)
Hung Hom
Kowloon City
To Kwa Wan
Roads in Kowloon